Ruston may refer to:

Place names
United States
 Ruston, Louisiana
 Ruston, Washington

United Kingdom
 East Ruston, Norfolk, England
 Ruston, North Yorkshire, England
 Ruston Parva, East Riding of Yorkshire, England

Companies
 Ruston (engine builder) (or Ruston, Proctor and Company), railway locomotive and industrial equipment manufacturer in Lincoln, England
Ruston & Hornsby, descendant of Ruston, Proctor & Co.
Ruston-Bucyrus, manufacturer of steam shovels and cranes

People

Given name
Ruston Kelly, American musician and songwriter
Ruston Webster, NFL general manager

Surname
Abigail Ruston, American shot putter
Anne Ruston, Australian politician
Audrey Hepburn (born Audrey Kathleen Ruston), Belgian-born British actress
John Ruston (bishop), South African Anglican bishop
Joseph Ruston, English engineer and politician
Nicolas Ruston, English artist
Dick Ruston, Canadian politician

Other
Camp Ruston, American prisoner of war camp
Ruston Way Park, park in Tacoma, Washington, United States

See also
Rustin (disambiguation)